Joseph Enterprises, Inc is a gadget company which is owned by Joseph Pedott and based in San Francisco, 
California, United States, North America. Two of their most popular products are The Clapper and the Chia Pet.

History
Joseph Enterprises was founded in California in 1981 by Joseph Pedott. The Clapper, whose slogan is "Clap On! Clap Off!", was first sold to the public on September 1, 1985. A trademark was filed on the brand name "Clapper" with the U.S. Patent and Trademark Office on July 9, 1986. A design patent was applied for on November 13, 1985, which was issued as D299127 on December 27, 1988. The apparatus was used for activating switches in response to different acoustic signals.

The Chia Pet was first introduced on September 8, 1977, and although its name is trademarked, the Chia Pet is not a patented invention. The first Chia Pet, "Chia Guy" was marketed and distributed in 1977. The first widely marketed Chia Pet, the ram, was marketed and distributed in 1982 although the trademark was not applied for until 1998.

Products marketed by Joseph Enterprises tend to be advertised on television during the Christmas shopping season, and therefore they are marketed as gifts.

References

External links
 Joseph Enterprises, Inc homepage
 Chia Pet - About.com

Companies based in California